Ronidazole is an antiprotozoal agent used in veterinary medicine for the treatment of histomoniasis and swine dysentery as well as Trichomonas gallinae, hexamitosis, Giardia, and Cochlosoma in all aviary birds and pigeons. It may also have use for the treatment of Tritrichomonas foetus infection in cats and for the treatment of Clostridioides difficile infection in humans.

References

Antiprotozoal agents
Carbamates
Nitroimidazoles